Hans Herrmann (born 23 February 1928) is a retired Formula One and sports car racing driver from Stuttgart, Germany.

In F1, he participated in 19 World Championship Grands Prix, debuting on 2 August 1953. He achieved 1 podium, and scored a total of 10 championship points.

In sports car racing, he also scored the first overall win at the 24 Hours of Le Mans for Porsche in 1970, in a Porsche 917.

After the death of Tony Brooks in 2022, Hermann become the last surviving F1 podium finisher from the 1950s.

Early career
The racing career of Herrmann, who is a baker by trade, spans from cooperation with pre-war legends like Alfred Neubauer to the beginning of the dominance of Porsche at the 24 Hours of Le Mans. He took part in now legendary road races like Mille Miglia, Targa Florio and Carrera Panamericana and is one of the few remaining witnesses of this era. Hans im Glück (lucky John) escaped from several spectacular incidents or accidents.

Herrmann had a remarkable Mille Miglia race in 1954, when the gates of a railroad crossing were lowered in the last moment before the fast train to Rome passed. Driving a very low Porsche 550 Spyder, Herrmann decided it was too late for a brake attempt anyway, knocked on the back of the helmet of his navigator Herbert Linge to make him duck, and they barely passed below the gates and before the train, to the surprise of the spectators.

Mercedes-Benz
From 1954 to 1955, he was part of the Mercedes-Benz factory team, as a junior driver behind Juan Manuel Fangio, Karl Kling, Hermann Lang and later Stirling Moss. When the Silver Arrows came back for the 1954 French Grand Prix to score a 1–2 win, Herrmann drove the fastest lap but had to retire. A podium finish at the 1954 Swiss Grand Prix was his best result in that year as he had to use older versions of the Mercedes-Benz W196, or the least reliable car.

In the 1955 Argentine Grand Prix his teammates Kling and Moss had to abandon early due to the extremely hot conditions on the southern hemisphere in January. Herrmann was called in to share his car with them for a 4th-place finish, giving one point each. Fangio won with two laps more. 
Hans was quick in the 1955 Mille Miglia with the Mercedes-Benz 300 SLR, comparably or even faster than Moss, but was less lucky than in 1954, as he had to abandon the race.

A crash in practice for the 1955 Monaco Grand Prix put Herrmann out for the ill-fated 1955 season, even though a comeback in the Targa Florio was intended.

Various marques
The next years saw Herrmann racing for many marques, in F1 for Cooper, Maserati and BRM. In Berlin's AVUS during the 1959 German Grand Prix the brakes of his BRM failed, he crashed in a spectacular way, being thrown out of the car and sliding along the track with the car somersaulting in the air.

With different versions of the Porsche 718 being used as a sportscar and as a Formula Two car, Herrmann scored some wins for Porsche, mainly both the 1960 12 Hours of Sebring and Targa Florio. When the open wheeled single seater version of the Porsche 718 became eligible for Formula One in 1961 due to the rule changes, the results in F1 were disappointing. Herrmann finished 15th (last) in the 1961 Dutch Grand Prix, which was the first ever F1 World Championship race to have no retirements. He left Porsche at the beginning of the 1962 season feeling that he as a local from Stuttgart was No Prophet In His Own Land compared to Californian Dan Gurney and Jo Bonnier from Sweden. Gurney scored two F1 wins (one non-championship) with the new Porsche 804, but Porsche retired from F1 anyway at the end of 1962.

Abarth
With the small cars of the Italian Abarth marque Herrmann spent 1962 to 1965 driving in minor races and hillclimbing events. He only took outright wins in lesser sports car racing events, such as at AVUS or the 500 km Nürburgring. The Abarths were hard to beat in their classes from 850cc to 1600cc, though. Being the only pro in a small team Hermann learned a lot about testing and developing, which helped him later. However, being dissatisfied with the preparation of his car for the 1965 Schauinsland practice, Hans went home to witness the birth of his son, Dino. At the end of the year he left Abarth for good to return to the manufacturer closer to his home.

Porsche

In 1966 he returned to Porsche for a comeback in the World Sportscar Championship, as Porsche started a serious effort there. Following several podium finishes with the still underpowered two liter Porsche 906 and later models, he won the 1968 24 Hours of Daytona in a 907 as well as the Sebring 12 Hours again, now together with Swiss Jo Siffert. The overall win of the 1000km Nürburgring always eluded him, even though Herrmann had taken part in each of these races at the Nürburgring since they were introduced in 1953, and had finished second three times in a row from 1968 to 1970, behind teammates Jo Siffert and/or Vic Elford.

Herrmann missed the win in the 1969 24 Hours of Le Mans with a Porsche 908 by only 120 meters , but it was he who finally scored the long-awaited first overall victory at the Le Mans 24 Hours for Porsche in 1970. He was assigned to Porsche Salzburg, the Austria-based factory-backed team owned by the Porsche family, which mainly entered cars painted red and white, the Austrian colors. In heavy rain, he and his teammate Richard Attwood survived with their Porsche 917K #23 as the best of only seven finishers.

Retirement
Half jokingly, Herrmann had promised to his wife before the Le Mans race that he would retire in case of a win there. Having witnessed fatal accidents of colleagues too many times, e.g. before the 1969 German Grand Prix when his teammate and neighbor Gerhard Mitter died, the 42-year-old announced his retirement on TV, after having driven the winning car in a parade through Stuttgart from the factory to the town hall. To get out of his contract with Porsche Salzburg, Herrmann had to recommend a replacement driver to Louise Piëch.

Using his contacts, Herrmann built a successful company for automotive supplies. He was kidnapped once in the 1990s and kept in a car trunk for many hours before escaping.

Herrmann has remained engaged in the racing community through his retirement, demonstrating historical cars at events such as the Solitude-Revival.

Racing record

Complete 24 Hours of Le Mans results

Complete Formula One World Championship results
(key) (Races in italics indicate fastest lap)

Notes
 – Shared drive with Karl Kling and Stirling Moss

References

Further reading 
 Frank Wiesner: Hans Herrmann Story, Motorbuch Verlag, 2008, 
 Bernhard Völker: Hans Herrmann – Ein Leben für den Rennsport, Motorbuch Verlag, 1998, 
 Hans Herrmann – Ich habe überlebt,  Motorbuch Verlag, 1971

External links

 official Homepage of Hans Herrmann 
 F1 results 
 Porsche 908 races 
 Porsche 917 races
 The famous Hans Herrmann race at Le Mans 1969 on DVD!

1928 births
Living people
12 Hours of Reims drivers
24 Hours of Daytona drivers
24 Hours of Le Mans drivers
24 Hours of Le Mans winning drivers
British Racing Partnership Formula One drivers
Ecurie Bonnier Formula One drivers
Ecurie Maarsbergen Formula One drivers
German racing drivers
German Formula One drivers
Maserati Formula One drivers
Mercedes-Benz Formula One drivers
Porsche Formula One drivers
Racing drivers from Baden-Württemberg
Scuderia Centro Sud Formula One drivers
Sportspeople from Stuttgart
World Sportscar Championship drivers
12 Hours of Sebring drivers
Carrera Panamericana drivers